Arie Vermeer (17 July 192216 December 2013) was a Dutch football player.

Club career
Vermeer made his debut for Excelsior on 4 October 1942 against Neptunus and played 278 matches in 13 seasons for the club. Honours include promotion to the former Dutch Eerste Klasse in 1946 and 1952.

International career
Vermeer earned his one and only cap for the Netherlands in a November 1946 friendly match against England. He is one of only 4 Excelsior players to play for the Netherlands.

Retirement and death
During and after his football career, he owned a butcher shop in Rotterdam for 60 years. He died after a short illness on 16 December 2013.

References

External links
Oud Excelsior speler en international Arie Vermeer, proexcelsior.nl 

1922 births
2013 deaths
Footballers from Rotterdam
Association football defenders
Dutch footballers
Netherlands international footballers
Excelsior Rotterdam players